hebdo may refer to:

Hebdo (European Commission), a weekly meeting of the European Commission
Charlie Hebdo, a weekly French satirical newspaper
L'Hebdo, a weekly French-language news magazine published in Lausanne, Switzerland.
hebdo-, an archaic decimal metric prefix